Governor Adam may refer to:

Frederick Adam (1784–1853), Governor of Madras from 1832 to 1837
John Adam (administrator) (1779–1825), Governor-General of the British East India Company in 1823
William Patrick Adam (1823–1881), Governor of Madras from 1880 to 1881

See also
Governor Adams (disambiguation)